Nicholas Polson (born 7 May 1963) is a British statistician who is a professor of econometrics and statistics at the University of Chicago Booth School of Business. His works are primarily in Bayesian statistics, Markov chain Monte Carlo and Sequential Monte Carlo, (aka Particle filter). Polson was educated at Worcester College, Oxford University and the University of Nottingham where his PhD supervisor was Adrian Smith.

Polson is the co-author (with James Scott) of the book AIQ: How People and Machines Are Smarter Together (2018), about the key ideas that played a role in the historical development of artificial intelligence.

Selected publications
 Eraker, B., M. Johannes and N.G. Polson, "The Impact of Jumps in Volatility in Returns," (2003) Journal of Finance, 58, 3, 1269–1300.
 Carlin, B.P., N.G. Polson and D.S. Stoffer, "A Monte Carlo Approach to Non-Normal and Non-Linear State Space Modelling" (1992) Journal of the American Statistical Association, 87, 493–500.

References
  Nicholas Polson at University of Chicago Booth School of Business 
 Nicholas Polson's Research page 
 Article : Do leveraged funds deliver long term? 
 Book chapter : Handbook of Financial Time Series

British statisticians
20th-century British mathematicians
21st-century British mathematicians
Fellows of the American Statistical Association
Living people
1963 births
Alumni of the University of Nottingham